The Ditrysia are a natural group or clade of insects in the lepidopteran order containing both butterflies and moths. They are so named because the female has two distinct sexual openings: one for mating, and the other for laying eggs (in contrast to the Monotrysia).

About 98% of described species of Lepidoptera belong to Ditrysia. As larvae, they initially feed on plants until they grow to become adults and feed on nectar. Distrysian lineage by the ones that live and cater from the host plant, or even the ones that live outside the plant constructing their own shelter. They function as herbivores, pollinators, and prey in terrestrial ecosystems, while also being extremely damaging to the development of agriculture. The Lepidoptera group can be divided into the primitive but paraphyletic "micromoths" and the derived monophyletic Apoditrysia, which include mostly larger moths, as well as the butterflies.
Those with a dorsal heart vessel belong in section Cossina. Others, having a ventral heart vessel, belong in section Tineina. While it is difficult to pinpoint the origin of affinities between clades, Tineoidea are found to be useful in understanding the vast diversity in Ditrysia. Obstecomera and Macrolepidoptera are other examples of Ditrysia's subclades. Apoditrysia, Obtectomera, and Macrolepidoptera will be considered monophyletic if one or more organisms are either included or excluded from the clade.

See also 
 Lepidoptera
 Taxonomy of Lepidoptera

References

Further reading

External links 
 Tree of Life project page: Ditrysia
 

 
Protostome unranked clades